Monteparano is a town and comune in the province of Taranto  in the Apulia region of southeast Italy. Monteparano was historically an  Arbëreshë settlement. After the inhabitants abandoned the Albanian Greek Orthodox faith they assimilated into the local population.

References

Cities and towns in Apulia
Localities of Salento
Arbëresh settlements